Pieter Nuyts may refer to:
Pieter Nuyts (1598–1655), Dutch explorer, diplomat, and politician
Pieter Nuyts (Governor-General) (d. 1708), Dutch Governor-General of the Dutch Gold Coast
Pieter Nuyts (writer) (1640–1709), Dutch poet and playwright

See also
Nuyts (disambiguation)